Sarah Hallam Douglass (d. Philadelphia, 1773) was an English-born American stage actress and theatre director.

She was married to Lewis Hallam, with whom she travelled to America to perform in his company in 1752. This was the first permanent theater company in North America and thus had a pioneer role in the theater history of America. Sarah Hallam Douglass, along with the other female members of the troupe, was thus among the first pioner professional actresses in North America. She was the leading lady of the company and performed principal female roles until she gradually left them to Margaret Cheer and Nancy Hallam in the mid 1760s.

Her spouse died in Jamaica, where the company had gone to perform.  After the death of Lewis Hallam she married David Douglass, with whom she formed the American Company in 1758.  Her son by Lewis, Lewis Hallam, Jr. became an actor in his mother and step father's company.

References

1773 deaths
18th-century British actresses
18th-century American actresses
18th-century theatre managers
18th-century American businesswomen
18th-century American businesspeople
English stage actresses
American stage actresses
18th-century English women
18th-century English people